"Not Strong Enough" is a song by Finnish rock band Apocalyptica. The song is the third single from their seventh studio album 7th Symphony. The song features Brent Smith of Shinedown on lead vocals. It was first released on iTunes on November 1, 2010, but not in the US, where another version of the song, featuring Doug Robb of Hoobastank on vocals, was released on January 18, 2011. The song was re-recorded with Robb after the band failed to secure the rights to release the song in the US with Smith's vocals from Shinedown's label, Atlantic Records.

Track listing

References

2010 singles
Apocalyptica songs
Songs written by Diane Warren
2010 songs